Ruth Baldacchino (born 1979) is an LGBT and intersex activist, former Co-Secretary General of the International Lesbian, Gay, Bisexual, Trans and Intersex Association (ILGA World), and Senior Program Officer for the first intersex human rights fund.

Education 

Baldacchino holds an M.A. in Women's Studies from University College Dublin and a B.A. (Honours) in Sociology from University of Malta. They lecture Queer Studies and Sociology at the University of Malta.

Activism and career

Baldacchino has previously served on the boards of the Malta Gay Rights Movement, IGLYO and ILGA-Europe and also serves as senior program officer for the first intersex human rights fund. They are a visiting lecturer at the University of Malta. Between 2014 and 2019, they served as co-secretary general of ILGA World. Since 2015 they have worked as program officer for the first intersex human rights fund, at the Astraea Lesbian Foundation for Justice.

Prior to joining Astraea, Baldacchino worked at the Ministry for Civil Liberties in Malta on human rights and social integration, participating in the process of developing and passing a groundbreaking Gender Identity, Gender Expression and Sex Characteristics Act.

Baldacchino has a non-binary gender identity, and describes the Gender Identity, Gender Expression and Sex Characteristics Act as providing "freedom to an individual to develop, establish and express their gender, rather than having the State or the medical professionals deciding that. In other words, ... to be allowed to determine what identity fits ... best and how ... to embody that identity."

Baldacchino has also closely engaged with intersex activists, particularly through the co-facilitation and coordination of ILGA's International Intersex Forums.

Baldacchino contributed to a 2015 national education policy on Trans, Gender Variant and Intersex Students in Schools.

See also 

 Astraea Lesbian Foundation for Justice
 International Lesbian, Gay, Bisexual, Trans and Intersex Association

References 

Living people
Maltese LGBT people
Intersex rights activists
Transgender rights activists
Intersex rights in Malta
Maltese LGBT rights activists
Alumni of University College Dublin
University of Malta alumni
1979 births
Non-binary activists